Luk Chau Shan is a 414 m high hill in Ma On Shan Country Park, Hong Kong.

History
Luk Chau Shan has been occasionally hit by wildfires, notably in 2008 and in 2020. The 2020 fire occurred in late February and lasted for 20 hours, during which over 80 hectares of land were burnt, including 55 hectares of country parks areas.

Features
Shek Lung Tsai and Shek Lung Tsai Stone Forest are located in the vicinity of Luk Chau Shan. Several rocks there have received nicknames, including the "canoe rock" or "dragon boat rock", the "lizard rock" and the "crocodile rock".

Access
Luk Chau Shan can be accessed via several footpaths from Mui Tsz Lam, Ma On Shan Village, Tai Shui Hang, Ngong Ping or Shui Long Wo.

References

Further reading
 

Mountains, peaks and hills of Hong Kong
Sha Tin District